Derrynane Abbey also known as Ahamore Abbey is a ruined abbey in Derrynane in County Kerry, Ireland. It is located near the town of Caherdaniel and is very close to Derrynane House, the house of Daniel O'Connell. The abbey is on an island appropriately named Abbey Island. It is accessible from the mainland through a beach. It is believed to have been built in the 6th century.

Structure 
The Abbey itself is in ruin. There are only 3 interconnecting buildings of the abbey left, all without a roof. The main church, like the other buildings, is overgrown and contains a number of graves, including those of Mary O'Connell (wife of Daniel O'Connell) and the eighteenth-century Gaelic poet, Tomás Rua Ó Suilleabháin. The three arched windows of the church are in good condition even though they are facing the sea. The other two buildings have little else of note but graves. In the graveyard surrounding the abbey, there is tomb made of white tile which has been chipped away in places.

Gallery

References

Christian monasteries in the Republic of Ireland
Buildings and structures in County Kerry
Religion in County Kerry
Ruins in the Republic of Ireland